Priero is a small town and comune of the Langhe, located  east of Ceva in the Province of Cuneo, Piedmont, Italy. Presently it has a population of 441.

History
The original settlement, on a hill called Poggio to the south of the present village, dates from around the beginning of the second millennium. A pieve, dedicated to the Virgin Mary, had authority over the churches at Costelnuovo, Montezemolo, Osiglia, Calizzano Murialdo and Perlo while the fortified ricetto was the seat of a viscount appointed directly by the Emperor. In the mid-14th century the Marquis of Ceva became Lord of Priero and in 1387 plans were drawn up for the construction of the settlement, which forms the basis of today's Priero.

Main sights
The village preserves its 14th-century layout. The remains of the old castle, the defensive walls and their towers are all visible. The church of Santi Antonio e Giuliano, first constructed in 1494, retains its original campanile. The rest of the building, however was demolished in the late 17th century and rebuilt in 1716 to plans by F. Gallo.

People
 Sylvester Mazzolini da Prierio (1456–57 – 1523)

References
 Comune di Priero, at vallinrete.org

Cities and towns in Piedmont
Comunità Montana Valli Mongia, Cevetta e Langa Cebana